State Route 153 (SR 153) is part of Maine's system of numbered state highways.  It runs  from an intersection with SR 6 and SR 16 to an intersection with Smith Lane near Sebec Lake in Dover-Foxcroft.  The route is also known as Greeley's Landing Road.

Route description

SR 153 begins at its southern terminus in Dover-Foxcroft at an intersection with SR 6 / SR 16 (just north of its intersection with SR 15).

Junction list

References

External links

Floodgap Roadgap's RoadsAroundME: Maine State Route 153

153
Transportation in Piscataquis County, Maine